Ebot is a microcontroller unit that is based on open source technology, by two Kuwaiti innovators. Its part of a Prototyping platform called Ebot innovation platform (software/electronics/mechanical parts) to allow fast and easy prototyping. The platform has received many national and international prizes.

Ebot Board is a mini integrated digital computer that consists of a processor, RAM and input/output peripheral devices. Unlike processors used in PCs, Ebot was designed for embedded systems to control operations.

Hardware 

The Ebot microcontroller was built using an (ATMEGA1284P) integrated circuit from the (AVR 8-bit) family, which uses 8 bits to build the commands.

The diagram consists of two layers. The first layer has (ATMEGA1284P) pin functions, the second has the Arduino-compatible pins (bootloader), and the second layer has the names of the (Ebot) pins. The pin names and placement have been modified to suit the unit’s inputs and outputs ports, which will facilitate the programming process for the user.

Firmaware 

Ebot is based in Arduino platform and firmware is open source and is available at gitbub

Software 

Ebot IDE was developed by CreativeBits Co., and was designed to teach programming in a simple way. The software allows users to program using a command-line interface or a graphical interface, with a Data Lab to analyze the records, a serial Monitor to view current readings, and an PC control Interface to add more advanced options.

Ebot IDE works like a magnet, where the user drags one component from one of the menus on the left (Input, Output, Flow) and drops it at the top of the graphical page. When dragging the next component, it will be attached to the previous one, and so on.

Supporters 

 https://www.moe.edu.kw/
 http://kuweb.ku.edu.kw/ku/index.htm
 https://kuwait.makerfaire.com/
 http://kfas.org.kw/
 https://www.ypa.gov.kw/
 https://www.aum.edu.kw/
 https://www.ack.edu.kw/en/
 https://www.gust.edu.kw/
 https://www.ascckw.com/
 https://www.kcst.edu.kw/
 https://www.arabou.edu.kw/kw/
 http://fablabuae.ae/
 http://www.ha.ae/web/guest/home
 https://dubai.makerfaire.com/
 https://makermedia.com/
 https://www.zain.com/en/
 https://www.mcdonalds.com/kw/en-kw.html
 https://boubyan.bankboubyan.com/ar/
 http://www.fabfoundation.org/
 http://www.cait.gov.kw/Awards/Local-and-international-awards.aspx?lang=en-US
 https://www.worldsummitawards.org/
 http://www.kisr.edu.kw/en/
 https://www.kic.com.kw/Home/DefaultEn.aspx
 https://www.youth.gov.kw/
 https://www.ntec.com.kw/
 https://wayoutkwt.com/

Awards 
 World Summit Award, First Prize- 2015 
 First Prize at Arab Mobile App Challenge WAMDA]  2015 
 First Prize at Kuwait eContent award 2015 
 First Prize at International Invention Fair in the Middle East 2015 
 First Prize at CLAWAR Competition  2015

Robotics education in Kuwait 
15 schools (primary and secondary) have been teaching robotics in Kuwait, and by the 2016 academic year it was planned to be taught on a wider scale in all state schools, according to the Education Minister  Bader Hamad Al-Essa. Certain errors will have to be rectified after they emerged during teaching it in some schools.

Robotics competitions offer a chance to encourage students to build their own solutions as a team to real-world problems using science and maths.

Certifications and standards 

The whole system has separate certifications in each department to fulfill all customer and business requirements.

Images of the certificates and test reports are shown below:

References

External links
 AlRai TV interview - Arabic
 SNOWBALL receives many national and international prizes- AlMajls Tv - Arabic
 SNOWBALL in Expo Milano 2015 - Arabic
 National robotics competition of Kuwait using E-Robot - 2015
 Interview about the second National robotics competition of Kuwait - AlWatan Tv - Arabic

Microcontrollers
Educational technology
Education in Kuwait